This is a list of LSU Tigers baseball seasons. The LSU Tigers baseball program is the college baseball team that represents Louisiana State University in the Western Division of the Southeastern Conference (SEC) in the National Collegiate Athletic Association. LSU plays their home games at Alex Box Stadium, Skip Bertman Field on the LSU Campus in Baton Rouge, Louisiana.

LSU has won six national championships, appeared in eighteen College World Series and played in the NCAA Division I Baseball Championship thirty-two times. The Tigers baseball team has won seventeen SEC regular-season championships and twelve SEC Conference Tournament championships.

Season Results

Notes

Sources:

References

 
LSU Tigers
LSU Tigers baseball seasons